Kuzmanovski is a Macedonian (Eastern South Slavic) surname. It may refer to:

 Stevica Kuzmanovski (born 1962), Macedonian former footballer
 Slobodan Kuzmanovski (born 1962), Serbian-born handball player

It is related to the Serbian surname Kuzmanović.

Macedonian-language surnames

Surnames